The 1969–70 Greek Football Cup was the 28th edition of the Greek Football Cup. The competition culminated with the Greek Cup Final, held at Lysandros Kaftanzoglou Stadium, on 28 June 1970. The match was contested by Aris and PAOK, with Aris winning by 1–0.

Calendar
From the last qualifying round onwards:

Last qualifying round

|}

• The last 16 of previous season's Cup qualified for the 2nd round.

Knockout phase
In the knockout phase, teams play against each other over a single match. If the match ends up as a draw, extra time will be played. If a winner doesn't occur after the extra time the winner emerges by penalty shoot-out.The mechanism of the draws for each round is as follows:
In the draw for the second round, the teams that had qualified to previous' season Round of 16 are seeded and the clubs that passed the qualification round are unseeded.
In the draws for the additional round onwards, there are no seedings, and teams from the same group can be drawn against each other.

Second round

|}

Additional round

|}

Bracket

Round of 16

|}

Quarter-finals

|}

Semi-finals

|}

Final

The 26th Greek Cup Final was played at the Kaftanzoglio Stadium.

References

External links
Greek Cup 1969-70 at RSSSF

Greek Football Cup seasons
Greek Cup
Cup